The final of the 2004 ICC Champions Trophy was played on 25 September 2004 between West Indies and England at the Oval, London. England qualified into the final by defeating Australia in the first semi final at Edgbaston while West Indies defeated Pakistan at the Rose Bowl in the second semi final. West Indies won the final by 2 wickets at the Oval, winning the 2004 ICC Champions Trophy. This was their first major tournament win since the 1979 Cricket World Cup.

Road to the Final

First Semi-Final
The first semi final was played between Australia and England on 21 September 2004 at the Edgbaston, Birmingham. England won the toss and decided to field first. Australia scored 259 runs for 9 wickets in 50 overs, with Damien Martyn scoring 65 runs from 91 balls. Darren Gough took 3 wickets giving away 48 runs in 7 overs. England, in the reply, chased the target of 260 runs in 46.3 overs losing 4 wickets. They won the match by 6 wickets and reached the final. Michael Vaughan scored 86 runs and received the man of the match award. With this victory, England achieved their first win over Australia since 17 June 1999 and ended a run of 14 consecutive defeats.

Second Semi-Final
West Indies played Pakistan in the second semi-final at the Rose Bowl, Southampton on 22 September 2004, and defeated them by 7 wickets. Pakistan won the toss and surprisingly elected to bat first on a pitch known for favouring the chasing teams. They scored 131 runs all out in 38.2 overs, with Yasir Hameed being the highest run-scorer—39 runs off 56 balls. West Indies achieved the target of 132 runs in 28.1 overs, their highest scorer was Ramnaresh Sarwan, with 56 not out. He was named the man of the match.

Result
The final of the 2004 ICC Champions Trophy was played between West Indies and England at the Oval on 25 September 2004. West Indies made England bat first after winning the toss. Despite a century (104 runs) from Marcus Trescothick, England were restricted to 217 runs in 49.4 overs. Wavell Hinds and Ian Bradshaw took 3 and 2 wickets respectively. West Indies started their batting with the early losses of Hinds and Sarwan, and at one moment they were restricted to 147 runs for 8 wickets; the highest run-scorer Shivnarine Chanderpaul (47 runs) had also departed. Courtney Browne and Ian Bradshaw scored 35 and 34 not out respectively which was the highest scoring innings of both their respective careers at the time and guided West Indies to victory without any further loss. They chased the target in 48.5 overs, and Browne and Bradshaw shared an unbeaten 71 run ninth wicket partnership, a West Indian record. Andrew Flintoff took 3 wickets for 38 runs in 10 overs. Bradshaw was given the man of the match award for his all-round performance while Sarwan was named the man of the tournament.

The Final

References

External links

ICC Champions Trophy Finals
International cricket competitions in 2004
2004 ICC Champions Trophy